Jan Michael Silverio Tan (born December 31, 1986), is a Filipino actor. He became famous after he became the Ultimate Male Survivor in the second batch of the reality show StarStruck aired on GMA Network.

Personal life
Tan is of Chinese descent. He was baptized on July 31, 2016, as a Born Again Christian.

Career
He played the role of Rick in the installment of Sine Novela Maging Akin Ka Lamang aired on GMA Network. Also, he had a special appearance on GMA Telebabad shows Babangon Ako't Dudurugin Kita which is the last program on GMA Network that he appeared.

There have been rumors of Mike transferring to ABS-CBN, but he has confirmed in a recent interview that he will remain with GMA. He also had his first religious television movie "Tanikala: Ang Ikalawang Libro" with co-star and former StarStruck Alumni Sheena Halili, and co-produced with CBN Asia, Inc., which was recently shown on GMA 7 during Holy Week 2010.

He recently appeared into a remake of Trudis Liit a final special offering of Sine Novela drama anthology where he played one of the series regular. Then he joined the cast of Captain Barbell: Ang Pagbabalik the sequel of 2006 series. Mike starred again into the upcoming TV series Kung Aagawin Mo ang Langit opposite Carla Abellana as the show's leading man. After the show's success, he starred in his first prime time series as part of the main cast, Legacy with Heart Evangelista, Lovi Poe, Alessandra de Rossi, Geoff Eigenmann and Sid Lucero. Right after Legacy, Mike came back in daytime soap via Faithfully as the lead man of Maxene Magalona.

Filmography

Television

Movies

Awards

References

External links

Sparkle GMA Artist Center profile

1986 births
Living people
Filipino male child actors
Filipino male film actors
Filipino male television actors
Filipino people of Chinese descent
Participants in Philippine reality television series
Reality show winners
StarStruck (Philippine TV series) participants
StarStruck (Philippine TV series) winners
GMA Network personalities
Filipino male models
People from Marikina
Male actors from Rizal
Tagalog people
Converts to evangelical Christianity
Filipino evangelicals